Vieux-Québec–Cap-Blanc–Colline Parlementaire is one of the 35 districts of the City of Quebec, and one of six that are located in the borough of La Cité-Limoilou.  The district is the most visited and toured location in the city. It is in this partly fortified area where the Château Frontenac is found, with its large terrace overlooking the city of Lévis, across the Saint Lawrence River. A large concentration of cafes, tourist shops, restaurants, hotels and inns are situated in the district. In its most recent census count in 2016, Statistics Canada reported that the district had a population of  residents, whom comprise % of the city's total population.

Portrait of the neighbourhood

The district comprises four distinct areas within the centre of Quebec City:

 Vieux-Québec (Haute-Ville), (Old Quebec (Upper Town)), which includes the space within the old town walls.
 Vieux-Québec (Basse-Ville), (Old Quebec (Lower Town)), including Place Royale, the Old Port and the area around the Gare du Palais.
 Colline Parlementaire, (Parliament Hill), including the area of Place D'Youville and the Parliament Building; the section between Boulevard René-Lévesque and Grande-Allée (up to approximately the Grand Théâtre de Québec); and much of the Plains of Abraham.
 Cap Blanc, a thin strip of land between Cap Diamant and the Saint Lawrence River, and centred on the Church of Notre-Dame-de-la-Garde.

History

Main arteries 
Rue Saint-Jean
Rue de Buade
Rue Saint-Louis and Grande-Allée
Boulevard Champlain
Rue Saint-Paul
Avenue Honoré-Mercier / Autoroute Dufferin-Montmorency (Autoroute 440)

Parks, green spaces and recreational areas 

 The Battlefields Park / Plains of Abraham
 Artillery Park National Historic Site
 Fortifications of Québec National Historic Site — this site consists of the walls and gates of Quebec, the Governors' Garden, Montmorency Park, Terrasse Dufferin, and the Governors' Walkway.
 Old Port of Quebec
 Place Royale

Notable buildings 
 Château Frontenac
 Édifice Price
 Citadelle of Quebec
 Séminaire de Québec
 Hôtel-Dieu de Québec (hospital) and its accompanying church

Places of worship 
 Cathedral-Basilica of Notre-Dame de Québec
 Notre-Dame-des-Victoires Church
 Cathedral of the Holy Trinity
 Chalmers-Wesley United Church
 St. Andrew's Church (Presbyterian)
 St. Patrick's Church (1833) — the first Irish Catholic church to be built in the city. It was abandoned in 1914, burned in 1971, and its façade is now part of an annex to the Hôtel-Dieu de Québec. 
 Notre-Dame de la Garde, Cap Blanc

Museums, theatres and exhibition spaces 
 Capitole de Québec (National Historic Site)
 Palais Montcalm
 Musée de la civilisation
 The Institut canadien de Québec building, occupying the old church  Wesleyan Church (Methodist, 1849).  Includes a performance hall and a branch of the  Quebec City Library.

Public administration 
 Parliament Building
 Quebec City Hall
 Édifice Marie-Guyart — the tallest building in Quebec City. The  skyscraper is the tallest building in Canada east of Montreal, and has at its top the Capital Observatory (Observatoire de la Capitale).
 Ministry of Finance of Quebec (in the old Court House)
 Palais de Justice de Québec (court house)
 Headquarters of the Société de l'assurance automobile du Québec
 Headquarters of the Société des traversiers du Québec

Places of learning 
There are no longer any public schools in the district, due to the small number of families with children living there. The few private schools that are there serve clients who live almost exclusively outside the city center.
 Private schools
 École Saint-Louis de Gonzague
 Petit Séminaire de Québec
 École des Ursulines (Old Quebec)
 CDI College
 Quebec Oral School for Deaf Children
 School of Architecture at the Université Laval
 Conservatoire de musique et d'art dramatique du Québec

See also 

 Quebec City
 Old Quebec
 Plains of Abraham
 Cap Diamant

External links 
   Vieux-Québec–Cap-Blanc–Colline Parlementaire interactive map
   Vieux-Québec–Cap-Blanc–Colline Parlementaire District Council
  Presentation on La Cite

Notes and references 

Neighbourhoods in Quebec City
Old Quebec